Lamboo Rastoo is a 2018 Gujarati musical drama film starring veteran Gujarati actress Shrenu Parikh  and Jay Soni in the lead role, with Manoj Joshi, Anang Desai, and Maulik Pathak. The film is directed by Mihir Bhuta for RKC Motion Pictures.

Plot 
Dhaivat, an ambitious musician, aspires to present a symphony that he created for his daughter at a symphony competition. However, the organizer of the competition, Param, doesn't want him to participate in the competition and kidnaps Dhaivat's daughter to stop him.

Cast 
 Jay Soni as Dhaivat Yagnik
 Shrenu Parikh as Shruti Yagnik
 Manoj Joshi as Dilip Mahajan
 Anang Desai as Shiv Hari Yagnik
 Maulik Pathak as Param Agrawal
 Archan Trivedi as Nayak Kaka
 Aditiben Desai as Sadhana Mahajan
 Jaanushi Oza as Clara
 Shraddha Dangar as Ragini
 Rahul Raval as Shrenik Mahajan
 Divya Thakkar as Mansi Mahajan
 Chintan Pandya as Sanjay
 Pradhuman Sinh Solanki as Parag
 Harsh Soni as Siddharth
 Bhargav Joshi as Shruti's Boss
 Sharik Khan as Rahul

Reception
In its review of Lamboo Rostoo The Times of India gave a rating of 3.5 stars from five, and concluded: ... "In the end, one feels that better editing in the second half would have led to a better end result. The excellent climax, however, leaves you pleasantly surprised and this one gets an extra star because of the innovative climax and earnest performances."

References

External links
 
 
2018 films
Films set in Ahmedabad
Films shot in Ahmedabad
Films shot in Gujarat
2010s Gujarati-language films